Scenes from My Life is the debut studio album by Cameroonian jazz bassist and musician Richard Bona. It was released on July 20, 1999 through Columbia Jazz.

Track listing

References

Richard Bona albums
1999 debut albums